The Charter School may refer to:

The Charter School East Dulwich, London, England
The Charter School North Dulwich, London, England
The Charter School, India
The Charter School of Wilmington, Delaware, United States

See also
Charter school, schools that receives government funding but operate independently of the established state school system